Euchromius anapiellus is a species of moth in the family Crambidae described by Philipp Christoph Zeller in 1847. It is found in France, Spain, Portugal, Italy, on Sardinia and Sicily, Tunisia, Morocco and Algeria. It has also been recorded from Turkey.

References

Moths described in 1847
Crambinae
Moths of Europe
Moths of Africa
Moths of Asia